Claudio Sartori (1 April 1913 – 11 March 1994) was an Italian musicologist.

Sartori was born in Brescia, Italy, on 1 April 1913. He studied piano and literature, two activities he loved his whole life. He went to university and graduated with a dissertation in history of music. He started his career as a librarian in a school in Bologna in 1939. Here, Sartori started to develop his interest for musical sources and he published several articles on musicology. During World War II, he joined the Italian resistance movement; he was imprisoned by the SS and then released in 1945.

After the war, Sartori started a career as a journalist in Milan writing for the newspaper Popolo di Milano. In the following years he worked as musicologist, journalist and music critic.

In 1947, Sartori was appointed to the library of the Milan Conservatory. From this moment on, Sartori devoted himself to research in musicology. His efforts were concentrated on the cataloguing of the musical sources, which, in his opinion, was the paramount priority in musicology. Sartori managed to obtain the support and cooperation of many correspondents and was thus able to collect an impressive amount of data from Italian libraries.

Since 1955, Sartori was a member of the Executive Committee of the International Association of Musical Libraries (IAML) / Association internationale des bibliothèques musicaux (AIBM). With all the data collected through the URFM, Sartori completed three works of the highest value: the bibliography of printed Italian instrumental music before 1700, Il nuovo Vogel, and the majestic Catalogo dei libretti italiani a stampa or Catalogo Sartori.

His daily hard work was interrupted only on occasion of his appointments as visiting professor at the universities of Buffalo in 1965 and Los Angeles in 1969.

Sartori died in Milan on 11 March 1994. His contribution to musicology is highly remarkable and it is the result of his energy, hard work and passion.

Works
I libretti italiani a stampa dalle origini al 1800. Catalogo analitico con 16 indici, Cuneo, Bertola & Locatelli Editori, 1990–1994, his major and last work.

References
Donà, M., Lesure, F. (1997) Scritti in memoria di Claudio Sartori, ed. Libreria Musicale Italiana, Lucca
 Martín Sáez, Daniel: "El 'Catálogo Sartori': I Libretti italiani a stampa dalle origini al 1800 de Claudio Sartori", Sinfonía Virtual, nº 29 (verano, 2015): http://www.sinfoniavirtual.com/libros/044.php

External links
Ufficio Ricerca Fondi Musicali
International Association of Music Libraries
Catalogo Sartori – The author

Italian music critics
Italian male non-fiction writers
1913 births
1994 deaths
People from Brescia
Writers from Milan
20th-century Italian musicologists